Kahlil Gibran (1883–1931) was a Lebanese-American writer, poet and visual artist.

Kahlil Gibran or Khalil Gibran may refer to:

 Kahlil Gibran (Kray), a 1991 bronze sculpture of the poet by Gordon Kray
 Kahlil Gibran (sculptor) (1922–2008), a Lebanese-American painter and sculptor
 Khalil Gibran International Academy, a public school in Brooklyn, New York, U.S.
 Khalil Gibran School Rabat, an international school in Rabat, Morocco

See also

Khalil Gibran Muhammad (born 1972), an American academic
Gibran Khalil Gibran Garden, Beirut, Lebanon